Fog (Spanish: Niebla) is a 1932 French drama film directed by Benito Perojo. It was made as the Spanish-language version of the film The Last Blow.

Cast
 Francisco Alarcon 
 José Alcántara 
 Pedro Elviro 
 María Fernanda Ladrón de Guevara
 Rafael Rivelles 
 José Rivero 
 Pedro Valdivieso 
 Ofelia Álvarez

References

Bibliography 
 D'Lugo, Marvin. Guide to the Cinema of Spain. Greenwood Publishing Group, 1997.

External links 
 

1932 films
1932 drama films
French drama films
1930s Spanish-language films
Films directed by Benito Perojo
Films scored by Zacarías M. de la Riva
French black-and-white films
Films with screenplays by Henri-Georges Clouzot
1930s French films